Oyalama Artık: The Remix EP 2 (Don't Put Off Anymore) is a remix EP by Candan Erçetin.

Track listing
Oyalama Artık (Radio Mix)
Kaybettik Biz (Remix)
Her Aşk Bitermiş (Remix)
Aşkı Ne Sandın (Remix)
Onlar Yanlış Biliyor (Remix)
Oyalama Artık (Flamenco Mix)
Oyalama Artık (Extended Mix)

Candan Erçetin albums
1998 EPs
1998 remix albums
Remix EPs